Ballard Blascheck (6 August 1904 – 16 January 1988), known professionally as Ballard Berkeley, was an English actor of stage and screen. He is best remembered for playing Major Gowen in the British television sitcom Fawlty Towers.

Life and career
The son of Joseph and Beatrice Blascheck, he was born in Royal Tunbridge Wells, Kent. He married Dorothy Long in 1929. During the 1930s he performed regularly in the so-called "quota quickies". One of his earliest roles was as the heroic lead in the 1937 film The Last Adventurers. 

He served as a special constable with the Metropolitan Police during the Second World War, witnessing the Blitz at first hand, including the bombing of the Café de Paris nightclub. For his service he received the Defence Medal and the Special Constabulary Long Service Medal.

He appeared in the film In Which We Serve (1942) and in the Hitchcock film Stage Fright (1950). He featured as Detective Inspector Berkeley in two episodes of Edgar Lustgarten's drama series, Scotland Yard: "Person Unknown" (1956), and "Bullet from the Past" (1957). 

Berkeley played the role of bumbling Major Gowen in the BBC TV comedy Fawlty Towers, and a similar role in the legal drama The Main Chance (1969). He portrayed another retired military man (Colonel Freddie Danby) in BBC Radio 4's The Archers, taking over the role from Norman Shelley.

He played a starring role in Fresh Fields as main character Hester's father Guy, was Hartley in To the Manor Born and played Colonel Culpepper in Terry and June. He had small roles in an episode of Citizen Smith (1977), an adaptation of Little Lord Fauntleroy (1980), and appeared once in Bless This House as a Royal Air Force Group Captain in the episode "Strangers in the Night" (1972), and in The New Avengers as Colonel Foster in the episode "Dirtier by the Dozen". He also had small roles in the BBC sitcoms Hi-de-Hi! ("Empty Saddles," 1983) and Are You Being Served? ("Memories Are Made of This," 1983).

He made a brief appearance in the 1985 American film National Lampoon's European Vacation which starred Chevy Chase. In this film, Berkeley played a British man who is involved in a minor road accident with the Griswalds.

Berkeley later performed the role of Winston—a similar character to "The Major"—in the radio comedy Wrinkles by Doug Naylor and Rob Grant. He played Badedas the Blue, a wizard in the radio comedy series Hordes of the Things. His last role was as the Head of the Army in the animated film version of Roald Dahl's The BFG. Berkeley died in London on 16 January 1988, and the film was released on 25 December 1989.

Selected filmography

Film

Television

References

Notes

External links

 

1904 births
1988 deaths
English male film actors
English male radio actors
English male stage actors
English male television actors
People from Royal Tunbridge Wells
Male actors from Kent
20th-century English male actors
Metropolitan Special Constabulary officers
British male comedy actors
British special constables